The Inn at Cooperstown is a historical hotel located in the Village of Cooperstown, New York on Chestnut Street (NY-80). It was built in 1874. It is built in the Victorian style. The Inn is a contributing building to the Cooperstown Historic District.

References

External links
Official Site

Buildings and structures in Otsego County, New York
National Register of Historic Places in Otsego County, New York
Houses on the National Register of Historic Places in New York (state)
National Register of Historic Places in New York (state)